This article is a list of diseases of strawberry (Fragaria × ananassa).

Bacterial diseases

Oomycete diseases

Fungal diseases

Miscellaneous diseases and disorders

Nematodes, parasitic

Phytoplasma, Virus and virus-like diseases

See also
 List of strawberry topics

References

Common Names of Diseases, The American Phytopathological Society

Strawberry

Diseases